Dwight Merle Agnew (January 1, 1902 – October 4, 1969) was a United States Navy officer from Fredericktown, Ohio. A destroyer commander during World , he was present during the attack on Pearl Harbor and later received the Navy Cross for his tactical acumen during the Guadalcanal Campaign. Post-war,  he led Destroyer Squadron 10 and later worked at the National Security Agency. In 1956, he was moved to the Retired List and made a "tombstone admiral".

Agnew married Thelma Marie Biegler, the daughter of United States Army officer and Medal of Honor recipient George W. Biegler.

Early life and education
Dwight Agnew was born in Fredericktown, Ohio, on January 1, 1902, to Murray Agnew and Emma Louise Agnew (née Follin). After graduating from Fredericktown High School he briefly attended Denison University before entering the United States Naval Academy. He graduated from the Naval Academy in 1926 and was commissioned an ensign.

Career

Pre-War
During his time on Nevada, its number four gun turret crew – under his leadership – won the Trenchard Medal for excellence in gunnery.

Attack on Pearl Harbor
During the Japanese attack on Pearl Harbor on December 7, 1941, most of the Agnew family – Dwight, his brother Henry, and both of their sisters and brothers-in-law (the latter who were also Navy officers) – were stationed in Hawaii. During this time, Agnew was serving as commanding officer of USS Trever, a destroyer minesweeper.

Like many American ship captains, Agnew was not aboard his vessel when the attack began at 0755 on December 7. Under command of junior officers, USS Trever sounded a General Alarm at 0757 and began returning fire against Japanese forces seven minutes later, successfully downing an Imperial Japanese Navy Air Service aircraft strafing the Pearl City Yacht Club as well as a second aircraft that was maneuvering to attack the ship. Following the attack, Wasmuth rendezvoused with Trever and Agnew rejoined his ship. Trever'''s depth charges had already been armed and set, and Agnew ordered a magnetic sweep of the harbor before taking up a defensive station at the harbor's mouth to protect it from a feared second wave attack that did not materialize.

The following week, on December 14, Agnew led the Trever in the rescue of the crew and passengers of the torpedoed Norwegian freighter MS Høegh Merchant. The Høegh Merchant had been sunk by a Japanese submarine while attempting to navigate to a safe port following the outbreak of hostilities.

World War II
In August 1942 Agnew was promoted to Captain. According to his citation:

In 1943 he was transferred to San Francisco, California, to oversee the outfitting of the new , subsequently commanding that ship during engagements in the Pacific for which he received the Bronze Star. Agnew was given command of the attack transport  in 1945, and commanded it during the Battle of Iwo Jima.

Post-War
Following World War II, Agnew held a variety of staff assignments in the Navy – including as the naval representative to the Joint American Military Mission for Aid to Turkey – and, from January 1952 to February 1953, was commanding officer of Destroyer Squadron 10 in the United States Atlantic Fleet. During the final three years of his military career, before his 1956 retirement, he was assigned to the National Security Agency. Upon retirement he was advanced to the rank of Rear Admiral. He died on October 4, 1969.

Personal life
In October 1929, Agnew married Thelma Marie Biegler, the daughter of Army officer George W. Biegler. Following the outbreak of World , Thelma Agnew and her son Dwight Agnew Jr, were evacuated to San Diego to stay with Dwight Agnew's mother, who was then living in the city.

His sisters were Dorothy and Elizabeth, both of whom married naval officers.

References

1902 births
1969 deaths
People from Fredericktown, Ohio
United States Naval Academy alumni
Military personnel from Ohio
Recipients of the Navy Cross (United States)
National Security Agency people
Attack on Pearl Harbor
People from Knox County, Ohio
Guadalcanal Campaign
United States Navy rear admirals (lower half)
United States Navy personnel of World War II